Kaisi Laagi Lagan is an Indian television series that premiered on Sahara One on 13 October 2008, based on the story of a cursed marriage.

Plot
The story revolves around the life of a girl named Pratha, who is raised solely by her mother since 5 years old.

Cast
 Mahhi Vij as Pratha
 Ashmit Kaushik as Raghav
 Priyamvada Sawant as Chitra
 Himmanshoo A. Malhotra as Swayam
 Romanchak Arora
 Prabha Sinha
 Sudha Chandran as Ambika (Raghav's Mother)
 Sandeep Mehta
 Satya Sarkar

References

External links
Kaisi Laagi Lagan News Article

Sahara One original programming
Indian drama television series
2008 Indian television series debuts
2009 Indian television series endings